The 2010 Pekao Szczecin Open was a professional tennis tournament played on outdoor red clay courts. It was the 18th edition of the tournament which is part of the 2010 ATP Challenger Tour. It took place in Szczecin, Poland between 13 and 19 September 2010.

ATP entrants

Seeds

 Rankings are as of August 30, 2010.

Other entrants
The following players received wildcards into the singles main draw:
  Marcin Gawron
  Rafał Gozdur
  Miloslav Mečíř Jr.
  Maciej Smoła

The following players received a special entrant into the singles main draw:
  Jan-Lennard Struff

The following players received entry from the qualifying draw:
  Dennis Blömke
  Nicolas Devilder
  Daniel Lustig
  Laurent Rochette (as a Lucky Loser)
  Peter Torebko

Champions

Singles

 Pablo Cuevas def.  Igor Andreev, 6–1, 6–1

Doubles

 Dustin Brown /  Rogier Wassen def.  Rameez Junaid /  Philipp Marx, 6–4, 7–5

External links
Official site
ITF Search 

Pekao Szczecin Open
Pekao Szczecin Open
Pekao Szczecin Open, 2010